Bishop Edward King Chapel is the chapel of Ripon College Cuddesdon, a Church of England theological college near Oxford, and of the Sisters of the Communities of St John Baptist and the Good Shepherd, a community of Anglican nuns.

The chapel is dedicated to Edward King, who was Principal of Cuddesdon Theological College 1863–73 and Bishop of Lincoln 1885–1910.

Following an architectural design competition managed by RIBA Competitions the elliptical building designed by Niall McLaughlin Architects was selected. It was shortlisted and runner-up for the Stirling Prize in 2013 and shortlisted for the European Union Prize for Contemporary Architecture.

References

External links

2013 establishments in England
Chapels in England
Church of England church buildings in Oxfordshire
Churches completed in 2013
Ripon College Cuddesdon
University and college chapels in the United Kingdom
21st-century Church of England church buildings